Ciobanovca is a commune in the Anenii Noi District of the Republic of Moldova. It is composed of four villages: Balmaz, Ciobanovca, Mirnoe and Troița Nouă.

References

Communes of Anenii Noi District
German communities